The 1988 Winter Olympics torch relay was run from November 15, 1987, to February 13, 1988, prior to the Calgary 1988 Winter Olympics.

Organization 

The planning of the Torch Relay required significant research and testing, with each kilometer of the relay test-driven three times, and estimates that each torch bearer would travel at a speed of 7 km/h. The relay kept to secondary highways as much as possible and used Snowmobiles for 2,750 km between Shanty Bay, Ontario and Prince Albert, Saskatchewan. Overall the torch travelled approximately 11,000 km on land and 7,000 km by air or sea.

Organizers, who initially expected to receive 250,000 entries, were inundated with over 6.6 million forms and called the response a sign that the Olympics had "fired the imagination of Canada". Part of the success for the number of applications was the OCO in February 1987 sending approximately 10 million applications out to virtually every Canadian household. The relay, called "Share the Flame", also saw the torch travel by boat, snowmobile and dogsled.

The Olympic Torch relay involved a convoy of 80 people in 40 support vehicles travelling 125 kilometers per day.

Relay 

The Olympic torch relay began when the torch was lit at Olympia and Greek runner Stelios Bisbas began what was called "the longest torch run in history". The flame arrived in St. John's, Newfoundland on the Atlantic Ocean two days later and over 88 days, traveled west across Canada. It passed through each provincial capital and many major cities, north to the Arctic Ocean at Inuvik, Northwest Territories, then west to the Pacific Ocean at Victoria, British Columbia before returning east to Alberta, and finally Calgary. The route was designed in a way that 90 per cent of Canadians lived within a 2-hour drive of the route.

The identity of the final torchbearer who would light the Olympic cauldron was one of OCO'88's most closely guarded secrets. The relay began at St. John's with Barbara Ann Scott, a 1948 gold medalist in figure skating and Ferd Hayward, the first Newfoundlander to represent Canada at an Olympic games in 1952, both representing Canada's past Olympians. The relay and ended with Ken Read and Cathy Priestner carrying the torch into McMahon Stadium representing the nation's current Olympians.  They then stopped to acknowledge the contribution of para-athlete Rick Hansen and his "Man in Motion" tour  before handing the torch to 12-year-old Robyn Perry, an aspiring figure skater who was selected to represent future Olympians, to light the cauldron. The choice of Perry was an unusual departure from most Games as the cauldron has typically been lit by a famous individual or group from the host nation.

Protest 

The relay was subject to peaceful protests by members and supporters of the Lubicon Cree First Nation at several stops in Ontario and Alberta in protest of ongoing land claim disputes between the band and the Crown, as well as discontent over an exhibit at Calgary's Glenbow Museum called "The Spirit Sings" that featured numerous artifacts stolen from native land.

Olympic Torch 

The design of the Olympic Torch for the Calgary games was influenced by the landmark building of the Calgary skyline, the Calgary Tower. The National Research Council Canada developed the design for the Torch, which was constructed of maple, aluminum, and hardened steel, entirely Canadian materials, the torch was designed to remain lit despite the sometimes adverse conditions of Canadian winters. The Torch had to be light enough for relay runners to carry comfortably, and the final design came in at 60 centimeters in length and 1.7 kilograms in weight. The maple handle portion included laser-incised pictograms of the 10 official Olympic Winter sports, and lettering was engraved on the steel cauldron portion. The torch used a combination of gasoline, kerosene and alcohol to allow a continuous burn during the unpredictable Canadian winter. Approximately 100 torches were manufactured for the Games.

The Calgary Tower itself was retrofitted to install a cauldron at its peak and was lit for the duration of the Games, one of several "replica cauldrons" constructed at Olympic venues throughout Calgary and Canmore.

Notable torch bearers 

 Alwyn Morris - Montreal, Quebec - 1984 Olympic kayaking champion.
 Linda Thom - Kingston, Ontario - 1984 Olympic gold medalist in shooting.
 Ben Johnson - Toronto, Ontario - Day 37 - Canadian Olympic Sprinter.
 Angella Taylor-Issajenko - Toronto, Ontario - Day 37 - Canadian sprinter and silver medalist at the 1984 Olympic Games.
 Maurice Vachon - Montreal, Quebec - Canadian wrestler in the 1948 Summer Olympics and professional wrestler.
 Marilyn Brain - Moose Jaw, Saskatchewan - Canadian rower silver medalist in 1984 Summer Olympics.
 Lori Fung - Vancouver, British Columbia - Canadian gymnast won gold medal in 1984 Summer Olympics.

References

Further reading
 
 
 

Torch Relay, 1988 Winter Olympics
Olympic torch relays